Ian Martin Sullivan (born 17 December 1977) is an English former badminton international player and an English National doubles champion.

Biography 
Sullivan affiliated with Gloucestershire, and became an English National doubles champion after winning the English National Championships mixed doubles title with Gail Emms in 2000.

Achievements

European Junior Championships 
Mixed doubles

IBF World Grand Prix 
The World Badminton Grand Prix has been sanctioned by the International Badminton Federation from 1983 to 2006.

Men's doubles

Mixed doubles

IBF International 
Men's doubles

Mixed doubles

References 

1977 births
Living people
Sportspeople from Gloucester
English male badminton players